Joe Tokam is a Papua New Guinean rugby league coach and administrator who coached Papua New Guinea at the 1995 World Cup.

Playing career
Tokam retired from playing in 1983.

Coaching career
Tokam coached Papua New Guinea in the 1995 World Cup. The team drew with Tonga and then lost to New Zealand. His one win was v Fiji on 19 Jun 1993, beating them 35-24 in Port Moresby

Administration career
In 2009 he worked as the operations manager for the bemobile Cup.

In 2011 Tokram worked as the PNGRFL Highlands regional development officer.

Tokram, along with Ivan Ravu, was appointed a caretaker manager of the Papua New Guinea Rugby League after the districts failed to meet the quorum to hold an AGM in early 2012.

In mid-2012 he was involved in legal action against the PNGRL. The court ruled the legal action invalid and ruled that he was no longer an employee of the PNGRL.

References

Living people
Papua New Guinea national rugby league team coaches
Papua New Guinean rugby league administrators
Papua New Guinean rugby league coaches
Papua New Guinean rugby league players
Papua New Guinean sportsmen
Place of birth missing (living people)
Year of birth missing (living people)